The Katzenstein is a  mountain in Saxony, southeastern Germany.

See also 
 Iron Way

Mountains of Saxony
Mountains of the Ore Mountains